Stuart Ernest Smith (September 25, 1915 – January 27, 2007) was a Canadian retired professional ice hockey forward who played 4 games in the National Hockey League for the Montreal Canadiens. He was born in Basswood, Manitoba. He died in 2007 in Lanark County, Ontario. He's the father of the NHL hockey player, Brian Smith.

References

External links
 

1915 births
2007 deaths
Canadian ice hockey forwards
Ice hockey people from Manitoba
Montreal Canadiens players